Daresbury, earlier known as Daresbury Rookery is one of the finest grand houses in Christchurch, New Zealand. Designed in the English Domestic Revival style, it is one of the best designs of Samuel Hurst Seager.

History

Daresbury was designed by Samuel Hurst Seager for the wine and spirits merchant George Humphreys. It was built between 1897 and 1901. It is regarded as Seager's best large house. It was initially added to until 1910, when it had 50 rooms and five live-in staff.

Jane Deans had planted 100 blue gums in 1862 on the property. Rooks were nesting in the trees, hence the name Daresbury Rookery.  The trees became infested by gall-making wasps (family Eulophidae, probably Ophelimus maskelli or Leptocybe invasa) and the rooks left in the 1930s. A snow storm in 1945 further damaged the trees. The last gum tree was cut down in 1952.

Between 1940 and 1950, Daresbury was the official residence of the Governor-General. Over time, the land was subdivided, with 20 sections sold in 1954.

The property was in family ownership until 1985. It was later owned by Libby and Denver Glass, who had to sell it again. They bought it back from developers Dennis Thompson and Sharon Bartlett in 2008 in a mortgagee sale.

Although earthquake strengthened by the Glass family, the building suffered damage in the 2010 Canterbury earthquake, with one of the six large chimneys collapsed and fell through the roof. The remaining chimneys were removed by crane.

Heritage registration

The building was registered as a heritage building by the New Zealand Historic Places Trust on 2 April 1985 with registration number 3659 classified as A. With the change of the classification system, the building later became a Category I listing.

Architecture and awards
Daresbury is an example of the English Domestic Revival style, also known as the Arts and Crafts movement. It is built of triple brick, and the upper stories are half-timbered.

In 1932, the property won the Christchurch Horticultural Society garden competition. In 2010, it won the Supreme Award of the Christchurch Civic Trust for restoration and refurbishment. The awards ceremony was held on 30 November, i.e. several weeks after Daresbury received significant damage from the 4 September 2010 Canterbury earthquake.

See also
 List of historic places in Christchurch

References

External links

 Governor-General The Lord Newall, Lady Newall, on the lawn at Daresbury Rookery

Heritage New Zealand Category 1 historic places in Canterbury, New Zealand
Houses completed in 1901
Buildings and structures in Christchurch
1900s architecture in New Zealand
Houses in New Zealand